The military ranks of Portugal form the system of hierarchical relationships in the Portuguese Armed Forces.

There are two basic systems of ranks. The first one is used in the Portuguese Army and in the Portuguese Air Force, consisting of traditional land military ranks. This system is also used in the National Republican Guard (GNR), a gendarmerie force that can be put under the command of the Armed Forces in case of war. The second system is used by the Portuguese Navy, consisting of traditional naval ranks.

In the Armed Forces of Portugal, the hierarchy of ranks divides them in three large categories: Officers, Sergeants and Enlisted. The officers category is, in turn, subdivided into three subcategories: General officers, Senior officers and Junior officers.

The insignia of rank used in all branches of the Armed Forces is generally similar, despite some particular details existing in each branch.

Commissioned officer ranks
The rank insignia of commissioned officers.

Other ranks
The rank insignia of non-commissioned officers and enlisted personnel.

Lusophone comparative tables
 Army
 Officers
 Enlisted
 Navy
 Officers
 Enlisted
 Air force
 Officers
 Enlisted
 Military police
 Officers
 Enlisted

Notes

References

External links
 
 
 
 

 
Portugal